The Capture of Malacca in 1511 occurred when the governor of Portuguese India Afonso de Albuquerque conquered the city of Malacca in 1511.

The port city of Malacca controlled the narrow, strategic Strait of Malacca, through which all seagoing trade between China and India was concentrated. The capture of Malacca was the result of a plan by King Manuel I of Portugal, who since 1505 had intended to beat the Castilians to the Far-East, and Albuquerque's own project of establishing firm foundations for Portuguese India, alongside Hormuz, Goa and Aden, to ultimately control trade and thwart Muslim shipping in the Indian Ocean.

Having started sailing from Cochin in April 1511, the expedition would not have been able to turn around due to contrary monsoon winds. Had the enterprise failed, the Portuguese could not hope for reinforcements and would have been unable to return to their bases in India. It was the farthest territorial conquest in the history of mankind until then.

Background

The first Portuguese references to Malacca appear after Vasco da Gama's return from his expedition to Calicut that opened a direct route to India around the Cape of Good Hope. It was described as a city that was 40 days' journey from India, where clove, nutmeg, porcelains and silks were sold, and was supposedly ruled by a sovereign who could gather 10,000 men for war and was Christian. Since then, King Manuel had showed an interest in making contact with Malacca, believing it to be at, or at least close to, the antimeridian of Tordesillas. In 1505 Dom Francisco de Almeida was dispatched by King Manuel I of Portugal as the first Viceroy of Portuguese India, tasked to, among other things, discover its precise location.

Dom Francisco, however, unable to dedicate resources to the enterprise, sent only two undercover Portuguese envoys in August 1506, Francisco Pereira and Estevão de Vilhena, aboard a Muslim merchant's ship. The mission was aborted once they were detected and nearly lynched on the Coromandel Coast, narrowly making it back to Cochin by November.

City
Founded at the beginning of the 15th century, through Malacca passed all trade between China and India. As a result of its ideal position, the city harboured many communities of merchants which included Arabians, Persians, Turks, Armenians, Birmanese, Bengali, Siamese, Peguans, and Lusong, the four most influential being the Muslim Gujaratis and Javanese, Hindus from the Coromandel Coast, and Chinese. According to the Portuguese apothecary Tomé Pires, who lived in Malacca between 1512 and 1514, as many as 84 dialects were spoken in Malacca. The Portuguese factor Rui de Araújo said it had 10,000 homes. While Albuquerque estimated a population of 100,000, modern estimates place the population of the city at about 40,000. Malacca kept a group of captured cannibals from Daru to whom the perpetrators of serious crimes were fed.

The city however was built on swampy grounds and surrounded by inhospitable tropical forest, and needed to import everything for its sustenance, such as vital rice, supplied by the Javanese. For supplying its population, Malacca depended on at least 100 junks annually importing rice from various locations: About 50–60 junks from Java, 30 from Siam, and 20 from Pegu. Malacca is mainly a trading city without any substantial agricultural hinterlands at all. As Ma Huan noted in the century before: "All is sandy, saltish land. The climate is hot by day, cold by night. The fields are infertile and the crops poor; (and) the people seldom practice agriculture".

Malacca had no wall except for bamboo stockades that were erected for temporary defense. This type of city is similar to Johor, Brunei, and Aceh. The richer merchants kept their trade goods by storing them in a gedong (godown) or stone warehouse, which is built partly below ground level. Ma Huan wrote:Whenever the treasure-ships of the Middle Kingdom (China) arrived there, they at once erected a line of stockading, like a city-wall, and set up towers for the watch-drums at four gates; at night they had patrols of police carrying bells; inside, again, they erected a second stockade, like a small city-wall, (within which) they constructed warehouses and granaries; (and) all the money and provisions were stored in them.According to Brás de Albuquerque, the son of Afonso de Albuquerque:

First contact with the Portuguese

Unimpressed with Almeida's lack of results, in April 1508, King Manuel dispatched a fleet directly to Malacca, composed of four ships under the command of Diogo Lopes de Sequeira, who was also tasked with charting Madagascar and gathering information on the Chinese. Sequeira received royal orders specifically instructing him to obtain permission to open a trading post diplomatically and trade peacefully, not to respond to any provocations and not to open fire unless fired upon:

By April 1509 the fleet was in Cochin and the Viceroy, Dom Francisco de Almeida, incorporated another carrack in the fleet to strengthen it. The decision was not entirely innocent, as aboard traveled several supporters of Almeida's political rival, Afonso de Albuquerque. Among its crewmen was also Ferdinand Magellan.

In the voyage he was well treated by the kings of Pedir and Pasai who sent him presents. Sequeira erected crosses at both places. He cast anchor in the port of Malacca, where he terrified the people by the thunder of his cannon, so that every one hastened on board their ships to endeavour to defend themselves. A boat came off with a message from the town, to inquire who they were.

The expedition arrived in Malacca in September 1509 and immediately Sequeira sought to contact the Chinese merchants in the harbor. They invited him aboard one of their trade junks and received him very well for dinner and arranged a meeting with Sultan Mahmud. The Sultan promptly granted the Portuguese authorization to establish a feitoria and provided a vacant building for that purpose. Wary of the threat that the Portuguese posed to their interests, however, the powerful merchant communities of Muslim Gujaratis and Javanese convinced Sultan Mahmud and the Bendahara to betray and capture the Portuguese.

Sequeira in the meantime was so convinced of the Sultan's amiability that he disregarded the information that Duarte Fernandes, a New Christian who spoke Parsi, obtained from a Persian innkeeper about the ongoing preparations to destroy the fleet, confirmed even by the Chinese merchants. He was playing chess aboard his flagship when the Malayan fleet, disguised as merchants, ambushed the Portuguese ships. The Portuguese repelled every boarding attempt, but faced with the sheer number of Malayan ships and unable to land any forces to rescue those Portuguese who had stayed in the feitoria, de Sequeira made the decision to sail back to India before the monsoon started and left them completely stranded in Southeast Asia. Before departing he sent a message to the Sultan and the bendahara in the form of two captives each with an arrow through his skull as a testimony to what would happen to them should any harm come to the 20 Portuguese left behind, who surrendered.

Preparations for the conquest

Upon reaching Travancore in April, Sequeira heard that Afonso de Albuquerque had succeeded Dom Francisco de Almeida as Governor of Portuguese India. Fearful of reprisals from Albuquerque for previously supporting Almeida, Sequeira promptly set sail back to Portugal.

At that same time in Lisbon, King Manuel dispatched another smaller fleet under the command of Diogo de Vasconcelos to trade directly with Malacca, based on the assumption that de Sequeira had been successful in establishing commercial ties with the city. Vasconcelos arrived in Angediva Island in August 1510 where he found Governor Afonso de Albuquerque, resting his troops after failing to capture Goa some months before, and revealed his intentions of sailing to Malacca straight away. Albuquerque had in the meantime received messages from the captives at Malacca, written by the factor Rui de Araújo, and sent through envoys of the most powerful merchant of Malacca, a Hindu named Nina Chatu who interceded for the Portuguese. Araújo detailed the Sultan's military force, the strategic importance of Malacca as well as their atrocious captivity. Hence, Albuquerque was fully aware that for Vasconcelos to proceed to Malacca with such a meagre force was suicide, and managed to convince him to, reluctantly, aid him in capturing Goa later that year instead.

With Goa firmly in Portuguese hands by December, Vasconcelos insisted that he be allowed to proceed to Malacca, which was denied. Vasconcelos mutinied and attempted to set sail against the Governor's orders, for which he was imprisoned and his pilots hanged. Albuquerque assumed direct command of the expedition and in April departed from Cochin along with 1000 men and 18 ships.

Crossing of the Indian Ocean

During the passage to South-East Asia, the armada lost a galley and an old carrack. At Sumatra, the fleet rescued nine Portuguese prisoners who had managed to escape to the Kingdom of Pedir; they informed Albuquerque that the city was internally divided, and that the Bendahara (treasurer) had been recently assassinated. There they also intercepted several tradeships of the Sultanate of Gujarat, an enemy of the Portuguese.

Passing by Pacem (Samudera Pasai Sultanate) the Portuguese came across two junks, one is from Coromandel, which is captured immediately, and the other is from Java which weighed about 600 tons. It is a very large junk, larger in fact than even their flagship, the Flor do Mar. The Portuguese ordered it to halt but it promptly opened fire on the fleet, after which the Portuguese quickly followed suit. They realized however that their bombards were mostly ineffective: Their cannonballs bounced off the hull of the junk. After two days of continuous bombardment though, the junk had its masts felled, its deck burned, 40 of its 300 crew killed, and both of its rudder destroyed, which compel it to surrender. Once aboard, the Portuguese found the king of Pasai, whom Albuquerque hoped he could be made a vassal for trading.

Malaccan preparations

At the time, the Malacca Sultanate covered the whole Malayan Peninsula and much of northern Sumatra. All of the sultan's possessions seem to have obeyed, to their capacity, his summons for war. Palembang, Indragiri, Menangkabau, and Pahang are all recorded as having sent troops, and possibly other territories did as well; the only renegade state recorded was Kampar, which provided the Portuguese with a local base. The sultan also recruited thousands of mercenaries from Java, who were paid in early August and given three months' wages in advance, and hired 3,000 Turkic and Iranian mercenaries. Finally, he assembled an armory of 8,000 gunpowder weapons, including cannons. The bulk of these were lantaka or cetbang guns firing 1/4 to 1/2 pound shots (they also included many heavy muskets imported from Java). In total the sultan's forces numbered, according to Chinese merchants who leaked information to the Portuguese, 20,000 fighting men. They had been gathered originally to campaign against Malacca's chief enemy in Sumatra, the Aru Kingdom.

Despite having a lot of artillery and firearms, the weapons were mostly and mainly purchased from the Javanese and Gujarati, where the Javanese and Gujarati were the operators of the weapons. In the early 16th century, before the Portuguese arrival, the Malays lacked firearms. The Malay chronicle, Sejarah Melayu, mentioned that in 1509 they do not understand “why bullets killed”, indicating their unfamiliarity with using firearms in battle, if not in ceremony. As recorded in Sejarah Melayu:

After (the Portuguese) coming to Malacca, then met (each other), they shot (the city) with cannon. So all the people of Malacca were surprised, shocked to hear the sound of the cannon. They said, "What is this sound, like thunder?". Then the cannon came about the people of Malacca, some lost their necks, some lost their arms, some lost their thighs. The people of Malacca were even more astonished to see the effect of the gun. They said: "What is this weapon called that is round, yet is sharp enough to kill?"

Asia Portuguesa by Manuel de Faria y Sousa recorded a similar story, although not as spectacular as described in Sejarah Melayu.

Reflecting decades later on how poorly the Malayans had fared against the Portuguese in Malacca and elsewhere, cartographer Manuel Godinho de Erédia enumerated many of the weaknesses of their ground troops. Among them were lack of ordered military tactics and formations, short weapon lengths, lack of armor, reliance on bows and javelins, and ineffective fortifications.

As the Malaccans had only been introduced to firearms recently after 1509, they had not adopted the practice of Europe and Indian cities of fortifying their port. As such, they relied upon the Gujaratis to help them build up such defenses. Gujaratis handled the work of building up the fortifications of Malacca entirely. A Gujarati captain who wanted to wage war to the Portuguese provided Malacca with Gujarati ships and promising a help of 600 fighting men and 20 bombards. Other foreign defenders of Malacca were Iranians, which were important traders in the Indian Ocean.

Portuguese conquest

By 1 July, the armada arrived at Malacca, salvoing their guns and displaying battle arrangements, which caused great commotion in the harbour. Albuquerque declared that no ship should set sail without his permission and immediately he tried to negotiate the safe return of the remaining prisoners still trapped in Malacca. As Albuquerque considered the Sultan's conduct to have been treasonous, he demanded that the prisoners be returned without a ransom as a token of good-faith, but Mahmud Shah replied with vague and evasive answers and insisted that Albuquerque sign a peace treaty beforehand. In reality, the Sultan was trying to buy time to fortify the city and call back the fleet, whose admiral the Portuguese identified as Lassemane (laksamana, literally, "admiral").

Albuquerque in the meantime kept receiving messages from the prisoner Rui de Araújo, who informed Albuquerque of the Sultan's military strength, through Nina Chatu. The Sultan could muster 20,000 men, which included Turkish and Persian bowmen, thousands of artillery pieces, and 20 war elephants, but he noted that the artillery was crude and lacking enough gunners. Albuquerque himself would later report to the King that only 4,000 of those were battle-ready.

The Sultan on his part was not too intimidated by the small Portuguese contingent. Albuquerque would later write to King Manuel that, to his great consternation, the Sultan had somehow managed to correctly estimate the total number of soldiers aboard his fleet with a margin of error of "less than three men". Thus, he remained in the city organizing its defence, "not realizing the great danger he was putting himself into".

After weeks of stalled negotiations, by the middle of July the Portuguese bombarded the city. Startled, the Sultan promptly released the prisoners and Albuquerque then took the chance to further demand a heavy compensation: 300,000 cruzados and authorization to build a fortress wherever he wished. The Sultan refused. Presumably, Albuquerque had already anticipated the Sultan's response at that point. The Governor gathered his Captains and revealed that an assault would take place the following morning, 25 July, Day of Santiago.

During the negotiations, Albuquerque was visited by representatives of several merchant communities, such as the Hindus, who expressed their support for the Portuguese. The Chinese offered to help in any way that they could. Albuquerque requested no more than several barges to help land the troops, saying that he did not wish the Chinese to suffer reprisals should the attack fail. He also invited them over to a galley to watch the fighting safely from afar, and authorized any who wished to leave to set sail from Malacca, which left the Chinese with a very good impression of the Portuguese.

First assault

Albuquerque divided his forces in two groups, a smaller one under the command of Dom João de Lima and a larger one which he commanded personally. The landing commenced at 2 am. While the Portuguese fleet bombarded enemy positions on shore, the infantry rowed their boats onto the beaches on either side of the city's bridge. They immediately came under artillery fire from the Malayan stockades, though it was largely ineffective.

Albuquerque landed his forces west of the bridge, known as Upeh, whereas Dom João de Lima landed on the east side, Hilir, where the Sultan's palace and a mosque were located. Once ashore, the Portuguese threw the barges' protective pavises on the sand to walk over the caltrops and gunpowder mines scattered all around.

Protected by steel helmets and breastplates, and with the fidalgos clad in full plate armour in the lead, the Portuguese charged the Malayan defensive positions, shattering any resistance almost immediately. With the stockades overcome, the squadron of Albuquerque pushed the defenders back to the main street and proceeded towards the bridge, where they faced stiff resistance and an attack from the rear.

On the east side, the squadron of Dom João faced a counter-attack by the royal corps of war elephants, commanded by the Sultan himself, his son Alauddin, and his son-in-law, the Sultan of Pahang. Briefly shaken, the Portuguese fidalgos raised their pikes and attacked the royal elephant, causing it to turn away in panic, scattering the other elephants and throwing the troops that followed into disarray. The Sultan fell from his elephant and was wounded, but managed to escape amidst the confusion. By the middle of the day the two Portuguese groups had met at the bridge, surrounding the last defenders who jumped to the river where they were intercepted by Portuguese landing barge crews. With the bridge secure, the Portuguese raised canvas sheets to protect the exhausted infantry from the intense sun. The assault was called off however when Albuquerque came to realize how short on provisions they were, and ordered the troops to embark again, setting the royal palace and the mosque on fire along the way.

To prevent the Malays from retaking positions on the bridge, the following day the Portuguese seized a junk, armed it with artillery, which included fast firing breech-loading guns and very long pikes to prevent it from being rammed by incendiary rafts, and towed it towards the bridge. At the rivermouth, it ran aground and immediately came under heavy fire; its captain, António de Abreu, was shot in the face but was unrelenting of his post, declaring he would command the ship from his sickbed if necessary.

Second assault

On 8 August, the Governor held a council with his captains in which he invoked the necessity to secure the city in order to sever the flow of spices towards Cairo and Mecca through Calicut and to prevent Islam from taking hold. For this assault, Albuquerque landed the entirety of his force, divided into three groups, on the western side of Malacca — Upeh — supported by a small caravel, a galley, and landing barges armed as gunboats. As the junk was dislodged by the rising morning tide, drawing the defenders' fire as it sailed towards the bridge, the landing began, while the armada bombarded the city. Once ashore, the Portuguese again quickly overcame Malayan defenses and recaptured the bridge, by then devoid of defenders. On either side the Portuguese set up barricades with barrels full of dirt, where they placed artillery. From the east side a squadron proceeded to assault the mosque, which again shattered the defenders after a drawn out struggle.

With the bridge fortified and secured with enough provisions, Albuquerque ordered a few squadrons and several fidalgos to run through the streets and neutralize Malayan gun emplacements on the rooftops, cutting down any who resisted them, with the loss of many civilians.

On 24 August, as the Sultan's resistance waned, Albuquerque decided to take full control of the city, commanding 400 men in ranks of 6 men wide through the streets, at the sound of drums and trumpets, eliminating any remaining pockets of resistance. According to Correia, the Malayans were greatly frightened by the Portuguese heavy pikes "which they had never seen before".

The cleanup operation took 8 days. Unable to oppose the Portuguese any further, the Sultan gathered his royal treasure and what remained of his forces and finally retreated into the jungle.

Sack

With the city secured, Albuquerque ordered the sack of Malacca, in the most orderly manner possible. For three days, from morning to nightfall, groups were given a limited time to run in turns to the city and return to the beach with whatever they could carry back. They were strictly forbidden from sacking the property of Chinese, Hindus, and Peguans, who had supported the Portuguese and were given flags to mark their households. The general population of Malacca was unharmed. The plunder was immense: Over 200,000 cruzados reverted to the Crown along with 3,000 bronze and iron bombards and several slaves. The cannons found were of various types: esmeril (1/4 to 1/2 pounder swivel gun, probably refers to cetbang or lantaka), falconet (cast bronze swivel gun larger than the esmeril, 1 to 2 pounder, probably refers to lela), and medium saker (long cannon or culverin between a six and a ten pounder, probably refers to meriam), and bombard (short, fat, and heavy cannon). The Malays also has 1 beautiful large cannon sent by the king of Calicut. Malaccan gunfounders were compared favourably with those of Germany, who were then the acknowledged leaders in the manufacture of firearms, and the Malaccan gun carriages were described as unrivalled by any other land, including Portugal. The Portuguese also captured 3000 of the 5000 muskets which had been furnished from Java.

According to Correia, regular soldiers received over 4,000 cruzados each, Captains received up to 30,000; At the time, 1,000 cruzados was roughly the equivalent of the annual income of a Count in Portugal. Albuquerque recovered from the expedition a stool encrusted with jewels, four golden lions and even a golden bracelet which was said to have the magical property of preventing the wearer from bleeding. He estimated that two-thirds of the wealth of the city remained.

Aftermath

The operation cost the Portuguese 28 dead, plus many more wounded. Despite Mahmud Shah's impressive number of artillery pieces and firearms, they were largely ineffective. Most of the Portuguese casualties were caused by poisoned arrows.

The Sultan was evicted, but was not out of the fight. He retreated a few kilometers to the south of Malacca, to the mouth of the Muar River where he met up with the armada and set up camp, waiting for the Portuguese to abandon the city once they were done sacking it.

Fortress

Contrary to Sultan Mahmud Shah's hopes, Albuquerque did not wish to just sack the city, but to hold it permanently. Stone was brought in by ships as there wasn't enough in the city for its completion. It had a garrison of 500 men, 200 of which were dedicated to the service aboard the 10 ships left behind as the fortress' service fleet. After the conquest, the Portuguese found a sepulcher (rock-cut tomb) below the ground, which stones were used to build the fortress. Additional stones were sourced from the walls and foundation of the Malaccan mosque.

Administration and diplomacy
 
As hostilities ceased, Albuquerque immediately realized that the maintenance of such a distant city would depend greatly on the support the Portuguese could gather from the local population and the neighbouring polities. He assured the inhabitants that they would be able to proceed with their affairs as normally. Nina Chatu was nominated the new Bendahara of Malacca and representative of the Hindu community. The Javanese, Lusong and Malay communities also got their own magistrates (although the Javanese representative, Utimuta Raja, would be executed and replaced shortly after for conspiring with the exiled Sultan). The trial of Utimuta Raja was the first act of justice the Portuguese carried out in Malacca according to Roman Law, with which "the people of Malacca was much relieved from that tyrant, and considered us folk of much justice"

New currency was minted with the support of Nina Chatu and a parade was organized through the city streets, in which the new coins were thrown from silver bowls to the populace from atop eleven elephants. Two heralds proclaimed the new laws, one in Portuguese and another in Malay, followed by the Portuguese troops marching behind, playing trumpets and drums, "to great astonishment of the locals", as Correia puts it.

Diplomatic missions were dispatched to Pegu and Siam to secure allies, as well as new suppliers of vital foodstuffs such as rice, to replace the Javanese, who were hostile to the Portuguese. Albuquerque had already sent an envoy, Duarte Fernandes, to Siam in July, while the assault on the city was still ongoing, and an exchange of diplomats secured the firm support of the King of Siam, who despised Mahmud Shah. The Kingdom of Pegu also confirmed its support for the Portuguese and in 1513 junks arrived from the Pegu to trade in Malacca.

While he remained in the city, Albuquerque received envoys and ambassadors from many Malayan and Indonesian Kingdoms (which included even Sultan Mahmud's son-in-law, the Sultan of Pahang), with gifts dedicated to the King of Portugal.

The Portuguese recovered a large chart from a Javanese maritime pilot, which according to Albuquerque displayed: 

Some of the information suggests adaptations had already been made based on Portuguese maps plundered from the feitoria in 1509. With such knowledge, the Portuguese learned the path to the fabled "Spice Islands", and in November, Albuquerque organized an expedition of three naus and 120 men to reach them, under the command of António de Abreu, who had previously been in the command of the junk. He was the first European to sail into the Pacific Ocean.

When Albuquerque left Malacca in January 1512, the inhabitants mourned his departure. Around the northwesternmost tip of Sumatra, the fleet faced a storm that wrecked Albuquerque's flagship, the Flor do Mar, with the loss of paperwork, an official letter from the King of Siam and the spoils and gifts intended for King Manuel, with the exception of a large rubi, a decorated sword and a golden goblet sent by the King of Siam which the crew managed to salvage.

In 1513, Jorge Álvares would set sail from Malacca and arrive in Canton, finally making contact with China.

Defence of Malacca and the fate of Mahmud Shah

Shortly after Albuquerque's departure, the city suffered a harassment by the forces of Mahmud Shah, but by then the Portuguese could count on over 500 men provided by the inhabitants of the city to assist them in repelling the attack. In May, the Portuguese, along with over 2000 local allies under the command of Gaspar de Paiva, forced the Sultan out of his encampment by the Muar River. Mahmud Shah then retreated to the Pahang Sultanate, where he narrowly avoided an assassination attempt. Afterwards, he moved to Bintan, an island-kingdom south-east of Singapore that he usurped to wage war on the Portuguese in Malacca, harassing the city, its trade and sabotaging their diplomatic relations with China, until the Portuguese eventually devastated Bintan in 1526, returning it to its rightful ruler and vassalizing the kingdom. Mahmud Shah then retreated to Kampar, Sumatra and led a government-in-exile there until his death in 1527. His son, Alauddin, would go on to found the Sultanate of Johor, and develop more or less pragmatical relations with the Portuguese.

See also
 Fortress of Malacca
 Portuguese Malacca
 Portuguese India
 Kristang people
 Battle of Pago
 Battle of Lingga
 Siege of Bintan
 Battle of Ugentana
 Battle of Ugentana (1536)
 Siege of Malacca (1568)
 War of the League of the Indies
 Siege of Johor (1587)
 Dutch Malacca

Notes

Citations

References

 Bailey W. Diffie, George D. Winius, Foundations of the Portuguese Empire, 1415–1580 (1977) 
 
 
  
 
 
 
  
  
 
 
 
 

Portuguese Malacca
History of Malacca
Malacca
Malacca
1511 in Portuguese Malacca
1511 in Asia
1511 in the Portuguese Empire
Malacca